Sir Robert Clifton (1767–1837) was 7th Baronet Clifton of Clifton, Nottinghamshire and High Sheriff of Nottinghamshire in 1820.

Family

He was the eldest son of Sir Gervase Clifton, 6th Baronet, and wife Frances. He succeeded his father in 1815.

Educated at Rugby School, he served as High Sheriff of Nottinghamshire in 1820.

He did not marry and was succeeded by his brother Juckes Granville Juckes-Clifton as 8th Baronet.

References

1767 births
1837 deaths
Baronets in the Baronetage of England
People from Nottingham
People educated at Rugby School
High Sheriffs of Nottinghamshire
Robert